Min Thu (born 5 April 1977) is a retired footballer from Myanmar who played as a defender for Myanmar national football team.

References

1979 births
Living people
Burmese footballers
Myanmar international footballers
Association football defenders